The 2009–10 Ligakupa was the third edition of the Hungarian League Cup, the Ligakupa.

First group stage

Group A

Matches

Group B

Matches

Second Group stage

Group A

Matches

Group B

Matches

Final

External links
 soccerway.com

2009–10 in Hungarian football
2009–10 domestic association football cups
2009-10